The Joe Dey Award is given by the United States Golf Association in recognition of meritorious service to the game of golf as a volunteer. It is named in honor of Joseph Dey, Jr., who was the USGA's executive director for 35 years and also served as the first PGA Tour commissioner.

Winners

2022 Ede Rice
2020 Lon Haskew
2019 Tom Dudley
2018 Gib Palmer
2017 Jayne Watson
2016 Keith Hansen
2015 Dr. David Cookson
2014 Michael Cumberpatch
2013 Taizo Kawata
2012 Stan Grossman
2011 Inez Muhleman
2010 Joe Luigs
2009 Dick Rundle
2008 Gene McClure
2007 Harry McCracken
2006 Bob Hooper
2005 Pearl Carey
2004 Adele Lebow
2003 John Hanna
2002 Clyde Luther
2001 Bill Dickey
2000 Jack Emich
1999 Frank Anglim
1998 Joe King
1997 John Staver
1996 Charles Eckstein

See also
Bob Jones Award

References

External links
USGA Joe Dey Award winner capsules
2009 Award
USGA - 2007 Joe Dey Award

Golf awards in the United States